Corrina Kennedy (born November 30, 1970 in Saskatoon, Saskatchewan) is a Canadian sprint kayaker who competed in the mid-to-late 1990s. She won four medals at the ICF Canoe Sprint World Championships with two golds (K-2 200 m and K-4 200 m: both 1995), a silver (K-4 200 m: 1997) and a bronze (K-4 200 m: 1994).

Kennedy also competed at the 1996 Summer Olympics in Atlanta, finishing fifth both the K-2 500 m and the K-4 500 m events.

References

1970 births
Canadian female canoeists
Canoeists at the 1996 Summer Olympics
Living people
ICF Canoe Sprint World Championships medalists in kayak
Olympic canoeists of Canada
Sportspeople from Saskatoon
Pan American Games medalists in canoeing
Pan American Games gold medalists for Canada
Canoeists at the 1991 Pan American Games
Medalists at the 1991 Pan American Games